What, No Men? is a 1934 American short comedy film directed by Ralph Staub and starring El Brendel, Wini Shaw, and Phil Regan. It was filmed in Technicolor. In 1934, it was nominated for an Academy Award for Best Short Subject (Comedy) at the 7th Academy Awards.

Cast
 El Brendel as Gus Olson, gas utility representative
 Phil Regan as Policeman
 Wini Shaw as Saloon Owner

References

External links

1934 films
1934 comedy films
1934 short films
Warner Bros. short films
Vitaphone short films
American comedy short films
1930s English-language films
1930s American films